Loganville is the name of several places in the United States of America:

 Loganville, California
 Loganville, Georgia
 Loganville, Pennsylvania
 Loganville, Wisconsin

See also 
 Logansville, Ohio